Holy Trinity Church, Lambley is a Grade I listed parish church in the Church of England in Lambley, Nottinghamshire.

History

The church dates from the 11th century. It was largely rebuilt around 1470 as the result of a bequest by Ralph Cromwell.

It has a single bell. Inside the church is a Jacobean rood screen.  On the outer walls can be seen numerous grooves where arrows were sharpened during  the middles ages, archery was practiced in the churchyard.

Burials
Ralph de Cromwell, 1st Baron Cromwell

References

Church of England church buildings in Nottinghamshire
Grade I listed churches in Nottinghamshire
11th-century church buildings in England